Jack and Jeremy's Real Lives was a 1996 comedy show for Channel 4, written by and starring Jack Dee and Jeremy Hardy.

The series was a collection of mockumentaries similar to their previous collaboration, Jack and Jeremy's Police 4. Each episode focused on the pair playing bizarre characters from a particular profession. The series was shot on film and featured no laugh track. The pilot featured Sacha Baron Cohen being electrocuted.

After three episodes it was moved to air after midnight due to low ratings.

Episodes and summaries

Aristocrats
A day in the life of aristocratic brothers has them solving a murder, attending a black magic ritual and visiting some poor people.

Writers
Struggling, troubled writers believe they've received their big break when Radio 3 ask them to do a poetry reading.

Paranormal Researchers
The pair search for evidence of ghosts in Barbara Castle, Dorset.

Restaurateurs
A fly-on-the-wall account of the working lives of Antoine-Antoine and Vincenzo Jean-Claude Arkwright, who run a top celebrity restaurant, Gliterati's

Consumer Watchdogs
The pair investigate fake newsagents, pension advice and pursue the manager of ageing boyband X-Citing.

Hospital Entrepreneurs
The pair attempt to run a profit-making hospital.

External links
Show Information at 'BFI'
 

Channel 4 comedy
1996 British television series debuts
1996 British television series endings
1990s British comedy television series
British mockumentary television series
English-language television shows